Lo-Key Fu is an Australian breakbeat producer, performer and remixer based in Perth, who performs his own music as a live electronic act. His music has appeared on solo releases, soundtracks and compilation albums.

2000-2003: Lincoln Street Switch & Rollerskates

In 2000, Lo-Key Fu formed Lincoln Street Switchwith drum and bass producer Scope (John Bamford), named after Lincoln Street in North Perth, Western Australia. The duo released a self-titled EP in 2000.

In 2000, Lo-Key Fu joined local original band Rollerskates as a live samplist, second keyboardist, hip-hop MC and vocalist and he remained a contributory member of this outfit until December 2003.

In 2003, Lo-Key Fu entered an original composition titled "A New Breed" into the National MusicOz song competition. This entry was selected as a finalist and placed as the National Runner-up for the Dance Music category.

2004-2007: Itchy Techno Finger & "Gung-Ho"
The debut solo album titled Itchy Techno Finger was released through QStik Records and launched to a capacity crowd at Ambar Nightclub (Perth, Western Australia) in July 2004. This album subsequently received national air play on Triple J, FBi, 4ZZZ, RTRFM, Twin Cities FM, Base FM and Pulse FM. After supporting Lee Coombs and Meat Katie with a live performance at Breakfest 2004, Lo-Key Fu was nominated for Best Live Electronic Act and won the title for Best Electronic Producer at the annual WAMi Awards in 2005.

In June 2006, Lo-Key Fu won The Contender, an international song competition held by Title Fight Recordings and Bijou Breaks for his original track "Gung-Ho" that included recorded vocals from singer Paula Graham. The 12" vinyl format was released internationally on 17 September 2007 featuring both the winning track, and a collaborative remix from Title Fight label owner Klaus Hill and label manager Dopamine. Both versions of the song were then released in digital format on 24 September 2007 exclusively through Beatport.

2008: "Style of the Rising Filter"
After supporting nu skool breaks forefather Rennie Pilgrem at Perth winter festival Major Break, Lo-Key Fu's signed with Bristol label Dead Famous Records. 

On 22 August 2008, he released the double a-side single "Tech-Resurrection" and "Style of the Rising Filter". and Juno Records 

Following the relative success of this release, Lo-Key Fu performed an original set at the Perth leg of Parklife – a nationally reputed spring festival – along with acts such as the Plump DJs, Soulwax, Blackalicious, Dizzee Rascal, Slyde and Goldfrapp.

Discography

Albums

Singles

Awards

West Australian Music Industry Awards
The West Australian Music Industry Awards (WAMIs) are annual awards presented to the local contemporary music industry, put on annually by the Western Australian Music Industry Association Inc (WAM).
 
 (wins only)
|-
| 2005
| Lo-Key Fu
| Best Electronic Producer 
| 
|-
|}

References

Ableton Live users
Australian musicians
Breakbeat musicians
Musicians from Perth, Western Australia
Remixers